In computer networking, TUN and TAP are kernel virtual network devices. Being network devices supported entirely in software, they differ from ordinary network devices which are backed by physical network adapters.

The Universal TUN/TAP Driver originated in 2000 as a merger of the corresponding drivers in Solaris, Linux and BSD. The driver continues to be maintained as part of the Linux and FreeBSD kernels.

Design 

Though both are for tunneling purposes, TUN and TAP can't be used together because they transmit and receive packets at different layers of the network stack. TUN, namely network TUNnel, simulates a network layer device and operates in layer 3 carrying IP packets. TAP, namely network TAP, simulates a link layer device and operates in layer 2 carrying Ethernet frames. TUN is used with routing. TAP can be used to create a user space network bridge.

Packets sent by an operating system via a TUN/TAP device are delivered to a user space program which attaches itself to the device. A user space program may also pass packets into a TUN/TAP device. In this case the TUN/TAP device delivers (or "injects") these packets to the operating-system network stack thus emulating their reception from an external source.

Applications 

 Virtual private networks
 OpenVPN, Ethernet/IP over TCP/UDP; encrypted, compressed
 ZeroTier, Ethernet/IP over TCP/UDP; encrypted, compressed, cryptographic addressing scheme
 FreeLAN, open-source, free, multi-platform IPv4, IPv6 and peer-to-peer VPN software over UDP/IP.
 n2n, an open source Layer 2 over Layer 3 VPN application which uses a peer-to-peer architecture for network membership and routing
 Tinc, Ethernet/IPv4/IPv6 over TCP/UDP; encrypted, compressed
 VTun, Ethernet/IP/serial/Unix pipe over TCP; encrypted, compressed, traffic-shaping
 OpenSSH
 coLinux, Ethernet/IP over TCP/UDP
 Hamachi
 OpenConnect
 WireGuard
 Tailscale
 Virtual-machine networking
 Bochs
 coLinux
 Hercules (S/390 emulator)
 Open vSwitch
 QEMU/KVM
 User-mode Linux
 VirtualBox
 Connecting real machines with network simulation
 ns-3
 GNU Radio
 NAT
 TAYGA, a stateless NAT64 implementation for Linux

Platforms 

Platforms with TUN/TAP drivers include:
 FreeBSD
 Linux, starting around version 2.1.60 of the Linux kernel mainline
 iOS (tun driver only)
 macOS (native support only for TUN (utun))
 NetBSD
 OpenBSD
 Android
 Solaris
 Windows 2000/XP/Vista/7/8/8.1/10
 QNX

See also 
 Point-to-point (telecommunications)
 MacVTap

References

External links 
 Tun/Tap interface tutorial
 Linux Networking: MAC VLANs and Virtual Ethernets

Internet Protocol based network software
Virtual private networks
Linux drivers
Free system software